Statistics of Primera División de México for the 1981–82 season.

Overview
It was contested by 20 teams, and UANL won the championship.

Atlético Morelia was promoted from Segunda División.

After the season, the owner of Atlético Español decided to sell the team to the Mexican league. This gave way for Necaxa to come back to play in the 1982-83 season.

Tampico was relegated to Segunda División, however, the oil workers' syndicate acquired the Atletas Campesinos franchise and created a new team called Tampico Madero.

Teams

Group stage

Group 1

Group 2

Group 3

Group 4

Results

Relegation playoff

Atlas won 4-2 on aggregate. Tampico was relegated to Segunda División.

Playoff

U.A.N.L. won the championship.

Quarterfinal

Atlante won 5-3 on aggregate.

Deportivo Neza won 2-3 on aggregate.

América won 5-3 on aggregate.

UANL won 3-2 on aggregate.

Semi-finals

Atlante won 1-0 on aggregate.

UANL won 1-2 on aggregate.

Final

Aggregate tied. UANL won 1-3 on penalty shootout.

References
Mexico - List of final tables (RSSSF)

Liga MX seasons
Mex
1981–82 in Mexican football